Fleurey is the name or part of the name of several communes in France:
 Fleurey, Doubs
 Fleurey-lès-Faverney, Haute-Saône
 Fleurey-lès-Lavoncourt, Haute-Saône
 Fleurey-lès-Saint-Loup, Haute-Saône
 Fleurey-sur-Ouche, Côte-d'Or

See also 
 Fleury (disambiguation)